Pineville is a city in and the county seat of McDonald County, Missouri, United States. The population was 791 at the 2010 census.

History
Pineville was originally named Maryville, and under the latter name was laid out in 1847.  The name was changed to Pineville in 1849 since another community already had the name of Maryville. Some say that the community of Pineville, Missouri was named for a grove of pine trees at the original town site, while others believe the name is a transfer from Pineville, Kentucky.

On August 17, 1897, Pineville was the site of a bank robbery which was one of the few at that time that involved a woman as an active participant in the actual robbery. Cora Hubbard, who was 20 at the time, John Sheets, a 23-year-old from Missouri, and 31-year-old Albert Whitfield "Whit" Tennison robbed the Mcdonald County Bank stealing a total of $589.23 (the equivalent of $15,700 in 2009 on the Consumer Price Index scale). All three were soon captured and imprisoned.

Jesse James (1939) was almost entirely filmed in Pineville. The sequel Belle Starr (1941) was also filmed here.

The county's historic Old McDonald County Courthouse, which is operated as a museum by the McDonald County Historical Society, was named to the National Register of Historic Places on May 1, 2012.

Geography
Pineville is located just north of the confluence of Big and Little Sugar Creeks, which forms the Elk River. Noel lies approximately six miles to the southwest, downstream on the Elk River and Anderson lies about six miles to the northwest, along U.S. Route 71.

Demographics

2010 census
As of the census of 2010, there were 791 people, 287 households, and 185 families living in the city. The racial makeup of the city was 92.0% White, 0.1% African American, 4.7% Native American, 1.5% from other races, and 1.6% from two or more races. Hispanic or Latino of any race were 3.2% of the population.

There were 287 households, of which 36.2% had children under the age of 18 living with them, 44.3% were married couples living together, 17.8% had a female householder with no husband present, 2.4% had a male householder with no wife present, and 35.5% were non-families. 31.4% of all households were made up of individuals, and 12.2% had someone living alone who was 65 years of age or older. The average household size was 2.63 and the average family size was 3.31.

The median age in the city was 33.8 years. 29.7% of residents were under the age of 18; 10.3% were between the ages of 18 and 24; 24.3% were from 25 to 44; 22.5% were from 45 to 64; and 13.1% were 65 years of age or older. The gender makeup of the city was 45.6% male and 54.4% female.

2000 census
As of the census of 2000, there were 768 people, 309 households, and 207 families living in the town. The population density was 1,094.0 people per square mile (423.6/km). There were 350 housing units at an average density of 498.6 per square mile (193.1/km). The racial makeup of the town was 95.70% White, 2.60% Native American, 0.39% from other races, and 1.30% from two or more races. Hispanic or Latino of any race were 1.04% of the population.

There were 309 households, out of which 33.7% had children under the age of 18 living with them, 48.9% were married couples living together, 14.9% had a female householder with no husband present, and 33.0% were non-families. 29.1% of all households were made up of individuals, and 13.9% had someone living alone who was 65 years of age or older. The average household size was 2.41 and the average family size was 2.98.

In the town the population was spread out, with 27.3% under the age of 18, 9.4% from 18 to 24, 28.8% from 25 to 44, 19.4% from 45 to 64, and 15.1% who were 65 years of age or older. The median age was 34 years. For every 100 females, there were 86.9 males. For every 100 females age 18 and over, there were 83.6 males.

The median income for a household in the town was $24,886, and the median income for a family was $34,583. Males had a median income of $23,182 versus $20,515 for females. The per capita income for the town was $13,414. About 19.3% of families and 23.2% of the population were below the poverty line, including 30.8% of those under age 18 and 20.4% of those age 65 or over.

Education
Public education in Pineville is administered by McDonald County R-1 School District.

Pineville has a public library, the McDonald County Library.

References

External links
 City of Pineville

Cities in McDonald County, Missouri
County seats in Missouri
Cities in Missouri